Saint-Symphorien-le-Château is a former commune in the Eure-et-Loir department in northern France. In January 2012 it merged with Bleury into the new commune Bleury-Saint-Symphorien, which was merged into Auneau-Bleury-Saint-Symphorien on 1 January 2016.

Population

See also
Communes of the Eure-et-Loir department

References

Former communes of Eure-et-Loir